St. Peter's Pool may refer to:

 St. Peter's Pool (Malta), a small bay on the island of Malta
 St. Peter's Pool (Scotland), a bay on the Orkney Mainland in Scotland